A district (zila) is an administrative division of an Indian state or territory. In some cases, districts are further subdivided into sub-divisions, and in others directly into tehsils or talukas. , there are a total of 766 districts, up from the 640 in the 2011 Census of India and the 593 recorded in the 2001 Census of India.

District officials include:
District Magistrate or Deputy Commissioner or District Collector, an officer of the Indian Administrative Service, in charge of administration and revenue collection
Superintendent of Police or Senior Superintendent of Police or Deputy Commissioner of Police, an officer belonging to the Indian Police Service, responsible for maintaining law and order
Deputy Conservator of Forests, an officer belonging to the Indian Forest Service, entrusted with the management of the forests, environment and wildlife of the district
Each of these officials is aided by officers from the appropriate branch of the state government.

Most districts have a distinct headquarters; but the districts of Mumbai City in Maharashtra, Kolkata in West Bengal, Hyderabad in Telangana, and Chennai in Tamil Nadu are examples where there are no distinct district headquarters, although there are district collectors.

Overview

Naming 

The majority of districts are named after their administrative centre. Some are referred to by two names, a traditional one and one that uses the name of the town that is the headquarters.  Since most of the districts are named after a town, the word "district" is appended to distinguish between the town and the district.

Similar names

Districts sharing their name with another district in India
Aurangabad district, Bihar and Aurangabad district, Maharashtra
Balrampur district, Chhattisgarh and Balrampur district, Uttar Pradesh
Bilaspur district, Chhattisgarh and Bilaspur district, Himachal Pradesh
Hamirpur district, Himachal Pradesh and Hamirpur district, Uttar Pradesh
Pratapgarh district, Rajasthan and Pratapgarh district, Uttar Pradesh
Raigarh district, Chhattisgarh and Raigad district, Maharashtra

Districts sharing their name with a district in a neighbouring country in South Asia
Bhojpur district, Bihar shares a name with Bhojpur District, Nepal
Daman district, Dadra and Nagar Haveli and Daman and Diu shares a name with Daman District, Afghanistan
Dang district, Gujarat shares a name with Dang District, Nepal
Ghaziabad district, Uttar Pradesh shares a name with Ghaziabad District, Afghanistan
Gopalganj district, Bihar shares a name with Gopalganj District, Bangladesh
Hyderabad district, Telangana shares a name with Hyderabad District, Pakistan
Lalitpur district, Uttar Pradesh shares a name with Lalitpur District, Nepal
Poonch district, Jammu and Kashmir, shares a name with Poonch District, Pakistan (the two were, prior to Partition, one district – which got split by the Line of Control, since then the two parts have been administered separately)

Districts sharing names with those outside of South Asia entirely
Dhar district, Madhya Pradesh, with Dhar District, Yemen
Banda district, Uttar Pradesh with Banda District, Republic of the Congo and Banda District, Ghana
Mansa district, Punjab, with Mansa District, Zambia.
Salem district, Tamil Nadu with Salem, Massachusetts, United States and Salem, Oregon, United States
Indore district, Madhya Pradesh with Indore, West Virginia

Districts having a name different from their headquarters 

Annamayya district in Andhra Pradesh, its headquarters being Rayachoty.
Alluri Sitharama Raju district in Andhra Pradesh, its headquarters being Paderu.
Ambedkar Nagar district in Uttar Pradesh, its headquarters being Akbarpur, Ambedkar Nagar.
Amethi district in Uttar Pradesh, its headquarters being Gauriganj.
Aravalli district in Gujarat, its headquarters being Modasa.
Balrampur district in Chhattisgarh, its headquarters being Ramanujganj.
Banaskantha district in Gujarat, its headquarters being Palanpur.
Bastar district in Chhattisgarh, its headquarters being Jagadalpur.
Bhadohi district in Uttar Pradesh, its headquarters being Gyanpur.
Bhojpur district in Bihar, its headquarters being Arrah.
Dakshina Kannada district in Karnataka state, its headquarters being Mangalore.
 Dang district in Gujarat, its headquarters being Ahwa.
Devbhumi Dwarka district in Gujarat, its headquarters being Jamkhambhaliya.
East Champaran district in Bihar, its headquarters being Motihari.
East Godavari district in Andhra Pradesh, its headquarters being Rajahmundry.
East Nimar district in Madhya Pradesh, its headquarters being Khandwa.
Ernakulam district in Kerala, its headquarters being Kakkanad.
Farrukhabad district in Uttar Pradesh, its headquarters being Fatehgarh.
Gajapati district in Odisha, its headquarters being Paralakhemundi. 
Ganjam district in Odisha state, its headquarters being Chhatrapur.
Gaurela-Pendra-Marwahi district in Chhattisgarh, its headquarters being Pendra.
Gautam Buddha Nagar district in Uttar Pradesh, its headquarters being Greater Noida.
Gir Somnath district in Gujarat, its headquarters being Veraval.
Idukki district in Kerala, its headquarters being Painavu.
Jalaun district in Uttar Pradesh, its headquarters being Orai.
Kabirdham district in Chhattisgarh, its headquarter being Kawardha.
Kaimur district in Bihar, its headquarters being Bhabhua.
Kalahandi district in Odisha, its headquarters being Bhawanipatana. 
Kandhamala district in Odisha, its headquarters being Phulbani.
Kangra district in Himachal Pradesh, its headquarters being Dharamshala.
Kanpur Dehat district in Uttar Pradesh, its headquarters being Akbarpur, Kanpur Dehat.
Kanpur Nagar district in Uttar Pradesh, its headquarters being Kanpur.
Kanyakumari district in Tamil Nadu state, its headquarters being Nagercoil (although there is a town named Kanyakumari).
Kaushambi district in Uttar Pradesh, its headquarters being Manjhanpur.
Kheda district in Gujarat, its headquarters being Nadiad.
Kheri district in Uttar Pradesh, its headquarters being Lakhimpur.
Kodagu district in Karnataka state, its headquarters being Madikeri.
Koriya district in Chhattisgadh, its headquarters being Baikunthpur.
Krishna District district in Andhra Pradesh, its headquarters being Machilipatnam.
Kutch district in Gujarat, its headquarters being Bhuj.
Mahendergarh district in Haryana state, its headquarters being Narnaul (although there is a town named Mahendragarh).
Mahisagar district in Gujarat, its headquarters being Lunavada.
Narmada district in Gujarat, its headquarters being Rajpipla.
Nilgiris district in Tamil Nadu state, its headquarters being Udagamandalam.
Palnadu district in Andhra Pradesh, its headquarters being Narasaraopet.
Panchmahal district in Gujarat, its headquarters being Godhra.
Prakasam district in Andhra Pradesh, its headquarters being Ongole.
Raigad district in Maharashtra, its headquarters being Alibag.
Rohtas district in Bihar, its headquarters being Sasaram.
Sabarkantha District in Gujarat, Its headquarter being Himmatnagar
Sant Kabir Nagar district in Uttar Pradesh, its headquarters being Khalilabad.
Saran district in Bihar, its headquarters being Chhapra.
Sindhudurg district in Maharashtra state, its headquarters being Oros.
Singrauli district in Madhya Pradesh, its headquarters being Waidhan.
Sirmaur district in Himachal Pradesh, its headquarters being Nahan.
Sitamarhi district in Bihar, its headquarters being Dumra.
Sonbhadra district in Uttar Pradesh, its headquarters being Robertsganj.
Surguja district  in Chhattisgarh, its headquarters being Ambikapur.
Tapi district in Gujarat, its headquarters being Vyara.
Uttara Kannada district in Karnataka state, its headquarters being Karwar.
Vaishali district in Bihar state, its headquarters being Hajipur.
Vijayanagara District in Karnataka, its headquarters being Hosapete.
Wayanad district in Kerala, its headquarters being Kalpetta.
West Champaran district in Bihar, its headquarters being Bettiah.
West Godavari district in Andhra Pradesh, its headquarters being Bhimavaram.
West Nimar district in Madhya Pradesh, its headquarters being Khargone.

States 
The following tables list the population details of various states. The columns include the hierarchical administrative subdivision codes, the district name, district headquarters, 2011 census population, area in square kilometres, and the population density per square kilometre.

Andhra Pradesh (AP)

Arunachal Pradesh (AR)

Assam (AS)

Bihar (BR)

Chhattisgarh (CG)

Goa (GA)

Gujarat (GJ)

Haryana (HR)

Himachal Pradesh (HP)

Jharkhand (JH)

Karnataka (KA)

Kerala (KL)

Madhya Pradesh (MP)

Maharashtra (MH)

Manipur (MN)

Meghalaya (ML)

Mizoram (MZ)

Nagaland (NL)

Odisha (OD)

Punjab (PB)

Rajasthan (RJ)

Sikkim (SK)

Tamil Nadu (TN)

Telangana (TS)

Tripura (TR)

Uttar Pradesh (UP)

Uttarakhand (UK)

West Bengal (WB)

Union territories

Andaman and Nicobar (AN)

Chandigarh (CH)

Dadra and Nagar Haveli and Daman and Diu (DD)

Jammu and Kashmir (JK)

Ladakh (LA)

Lakshadweep (LD)

National Capital Territory of Delhi (DL)

Puducherry (PY)

See also 
Administrative divisions of India
Municipalities of India
Districts of British India

Footnotes

References

External links 
 Districts of India, Indian Ministry of Electronics & Information Technology website

India 3
Districts, India

Districts of India